is a Japanese AV idol and pink film actress. She has appeared in award-winning pink films, and was given a "Best Actress" award for her work in this genre in 2007.

Life and career 
Hirasawa had a part-time job at the video arcade in Tokyo's Ōkura Theater, a long-running venue for pink films, and became curious about the genre through the posters. She entered the entertainment field in 2003 through AVs where she specialized in the S&M genre  while working for such major AV studios as Moodyz, Soft On Demand, CineMagic and Wanz Factory. After she had appeared in over 40 AVs, Hirasawa made her pink film debut in director Shinji Imaoka's Frog Song (2005). Hirasawa played the role of Kyōko, an aspiring comic book artist who works as a prostitute. The film was named the Best Film of the year, and Hirasawa was given the Best Actress award, second place, at the Pink Grand Prix. A few months later, in October 2005, she starred in the sex comedy The Strange Saga of Hiroshi the Freeloading Sex Machine, directed by Yūji Tajiri, which was shown at the 14th Raindance Film Festival in September 2006. Hirasawa had the role of the indulging love interest of the film's titular character.

After mid-2005, Hirasawa moved away from adult video work and more into mainstream and pink films, and V-Cinema. In her last entry on her AV blog in May 2006, she announced that she was leaving her agency "GOT" (ガットエージェンシー) and would be working freelance. Director Osamu Sato's 2007 film New Tokyo Decadence - The Slave was reportedly based on Hirasawa's own experiences. The film was named 9th best pink release of the year, and Hirasawa won the Best Actress award for her performance.

Selected filmography

Bibliography

English

Japanese

References

External links
 
 Hirasawa's blog at DMM

 
|-
! colspan="3" style="background: #DAA520;" | Pink Grand Prix
|-

|-
! colspan="3" style="background: #DAA520;" | Pinky Ribbon Awards
|-

|-

1983 births
Japanese pornographic film actresses
Pink film actors
Living people
Actors from Miyagi Prefecture